Magnus Ulleland (10 September 1929 – 7 March 2016) was a Norwegian philologist.

Ulleland was born in Flora. He was appointed professor at the University of Oslo from 1974 to 1976. He was a member of the Norwegian Academy of Science and Letters. Among his works are several translations from Italian language into Nynorsk, and he was decorated with the Order of Merit of the Italian Republic in 1999.

References

1929 births
2016 deaths
People from Flora, Norway
Norwegian philologists
Translators from Italian
20th-century translators
Academic staff of the University of Oslo
Members of the Norwegian Academy of Science and Letters
Grand Officers of the Order of Merit of the Italian Republic